Port Said Governorate is one of the Canal Zone governorates of Egypt. It is located in the northeastern part of the country, on the Mediterranean Sea at the northern gate of the Suez Canal, making it the second most important harbor in Egypt. Its capital is the city of Port Said, and it is the home of the Suez Canal Authority historical administrative building and the Lighthouse of Port Said.

Port Said Governorate is wholly urban, with 98.2% of the area populated. Most of the districts of the Governorate lie on the African side of the Suez Canal, although Port Fuad lies on the Asian side.

Geography

In 2015 a huge natural gas reserve was discovered off the coast of Port Said and was described as "the largest ever found in the Mediterranean Sea". Egypt now has one of the largest areas of natural gas and Italian company, ENI has been contracted to work on the natural gas liquefaction for Egypt. It was welcome news as Egypt has long suffered an energy crisis.

The New Suez Canal project launched in 2015 included dredging of the East Port Said Canal.

Port Said East

Located on the Sinai side of the canal, Port Said East is a development project that contains the Suez Canal Container Terminal, which opened in 2004. 

In November 2015, president Abdel Fattah el-Sisi publicly launched a new harbour development project at East Port Said.

A side canal at Port Said East was opened in 2016.

Municipal divisions
According to the Port Said Governorate website, it is divided into the following municipal divisions for administrative purposes. El Sharq, El Arab, Port Fuad, El Manakh, El Dawahy, El Zohur, West (El Gharb), South (El Ganoub).

Divisions of the governorate, at the 2006 census, included Mubarak East (the zone east of the new channel), Port Fuad 2 (the southern half of Fuad Island), Ganoub 2 (the southern part of South district), El Manasrah (now El Gharb), and a police department covering the docks. The total estimated population as of July 2017 was 751,073.

Demographics
The total population was estimated at the end of 2016 to be 684,303. With an urbanization rate of 100%, the Port Said Governorate is one of the most urbanized in the country, along with Cairo and Suez. The governorate is treated as one urban agglomeration by the United Nations Department of Economic and Social Affairs.

Social unrest
In February 2012, more than 70 people died in the Port Said Stadium Riot after a football match. Social unrest in early 2013 continued for at least two weeks. While protesting on March 5, 2013, protesters set fire to the governorate's headquarters and several people were injured.

In October 2016, some Egyptians protested rent increases.

Industrial zones in Port Said
According to the Egyptian Governing Authority for Investment and Free Zones (GAFI), in affiliation with the Ministry of Investment and International Cooperation, the following industrial zones are located in this governorate:
The industrial zone C 1
The industrial zone C 6
The industrial zone C 11
The Northwest Bortex 
The industrial zone south of Port Said (Al Reswah)

New urban community industrial zone
 East Port Said

Economy

To promote trade, during his presidency, Anwar Sadat declared it a duty-free zone. Port Said Governorate is a major transit point for trade, importing and exporting millions of tons of goods each year. Tourism is also promoted for the region.

Important sites

There are several museums in this area. For cultural tourism one may want to visit the Port Said National Museum of Antiquities which opened in 1987 and is located at the confluence of the Suez Canal waters and the Mediterranean Sea. It houses about 9,000 artifacts from all eras, ranging from the Pharaonic, Greek, Roman, and modern eras, as well as Coptic and Islamic eras.
The Military Museum of Port Said, established in 1964, commemorates the 1956 the tripartite aggression on the city. It features armory and military artifacts, equipment used in the wars fought between 1956 - 1967 and in 1973. El Nasr Museum of Modern Art in Port Said opened on December 25, 1995 and includes artwork by Egyptian artists in various branches of Fine Art.

The Statue de Lesseps, honoring Ferdinand de Lesseps, the developer of the Suez and Panama Canals, has its base at the entrance to the Suez Canal, along Palestine Street, where passing ships come from all over the world. This makes it a favorite with tourists. Nearby, is the Suez Canal Authority building built on the banks of Port Said at the start of the project.

The lighthouse and jetties at Port Said, located at the northern terminus of the Suez canal, and completed in 1869, were built of concrete of Teil lime and Port Said sand. The lighthouse is a monolith 180 feet high. In the construction 120,000 tons of Teil hydraulic lime were used. It was an important engineering feat involving 25,000 blocks, each weighing twenty-five tons.

Tall al Faramah, also called Pelusium, is of Ecclesiastical and archeological importance. It is an archeological, prehistoric site with ruins and a Byzantine church.

In 2004, the marine sector of Egypt had 3,013 fishermen who were categorized in the recreational fishing sector, fishing in and around the Mediterranean Sea and Red Sea. "Recreational fishing is widely practised along the Mediterranean Coast", where Port Said is located.

One can find historic churches in Port Said Governorate. There is a Roman Church, established in 1926, a Melkite Greek Catholic Church called Saint Elias Greek Catholic Church, and an old French Cathedral.

See also 
 Governorates of Egypt

References

External links
 Port Said Governorate official website
 Port Said history 
 El Wattan News of Port Said Governorate

 
Governorates of Egypt